The 2018–19 Wright State Raiders women's basketball team represented Wright State University during the 2018–19 NCAA Division I women's basketball season. The Raiders, led by third year head coach Katrina Merriweather, played their home games at the Nutter Center in Fairborn, Ohio, as members of the Horizon League. They finished the season 27–7, 16–2 in Horizon League play win the Horizon regular season title. They won the Horizon women's tournament and earn an received automatic bid of the NCAA women's tournament for the first time since 2014, where they lost to Texas A&M in the first round.

Roster

Schedule and results

|-
!colspan=9 style=| Exhibition

|-
!colspan=9 style=| Non-conference regular season

|-
!colspan=9 style=| Horizon League regular season

|-
!colspan=9 style=| Horizon League Women's Tournament

|-
!colspan=9 style=| NCAA Women's Tournament

See also
 2018–19 Wright State Raiders men's basketball team

References

Wright State Raiders women's basketball seasons
Wright State
Wright State
Wright State Raiders women's b
Wright State Raiders women's b